Wiesław Michnikowski (3 June 1922, in Warsaw – 29 September 2017, in Warsaw) was a Polish stage, cabaret, and film actor.

He performed at such satirical theaters (cabarets) as Kabaret Wagabunda, Kabaret Starszych Panów and  Kabaret Dudek.

Selected filmography
 Warszawska syrena (1956)
 Gangsterzy i filantropi (1963)
 Hydrozagadka (1970)
 Hallo Szpicbródka, czyli ostatni występ króla kasiarzy (1978)
 Seksmisja (1983)
 Akademia Pana Kleksa (1984)
 Podróże Pana Kleksa (1986)
 Skutki noszenia kapelusza w maju (1993)

External links
 

1922 births
2017 deaths
Polish cabaret performers
Polish male film actors
Polish male stage actors
Polish male television actors
Polish male voice actors
Knights of the Order of Polonia Restituta
Recipients of the Gold Cross of Merit (Poland)
Recipients of the Gold Medal for Merit to Culture – Gloria Artis
20th-century Polish male actors
Male actors from Warsaw
Recipient of the Meritorious Activist of Culture badge